Nivedyam is a 1978 Indian Malayalam-language film, directed by J. Sasikumar. The film stars Prem Nazir, KR Vijaya, KP Ummer and MG Soman in the lead roles. The film has musical score by G. Devarajan.

Cast
Prem Nazir 
K. P. Ummer 
K. R. Vijaya 
M. G. Soman
Adoor Bhasi 
Sankaradi 
Sreelatha Namboothiri 
Unnimary

Soundtrack
The music was composed by G. Devarajan and the lyrics were written by Sreekumaran Thampi, Mankombu Gopalakrishnan, Yusufali Kechery and Chirayinkeezhu Ramakrishnan Nair.

References

External links
 

1978 films
1970s Malayalam-language films
Films directed by J. Sasikumar